Thomas Bavister (1850 – 2 January 1923) was an English-born Australian politician.

He was born in Sheffield in Yorkshire to platelayer Joseph Bavister and Kesiah Langley, and moved to Bedfordshire at a young age. He received a primary education, but left school at fourteen to become an apprentice bricklayer. He returned to Sheffield in 1871 and became involved in the local bricklayers' union. On 3 September 1873 he married Harriet Green. In 1883 he migrated to Sydney, where he was soon involved in the United Operative Bricklayers' Society of New South Wales, serving as a delegate on the Trades and Labor Council from 1889 to 1890. In 1891 he was elected to the New South Wales Legislative Assembly as the Labor member for Canterbury. By 1894, when he moved to the seat of Ashfield, he had become a Free Trader, having refused to sign the pledge enforcing a binding vote in 1893. Defeated in 1898, he was subsequently a delegate of the Sydney Labor Council from 1900 to 1908. Bavister died at Kogarah in 1923.

References

 

1850 births
1923 deaths
Members of the New South Wales Legislative Assembly
Australian Labor Party members of the Parliament of New South Wales
Free Trade Party politicians
English emigrants to colonial Australia